Edward McCollin Arnett (September 25, 1922 – May 11, 2022) was an American chemist.

Early life
Born in Philadelphia, to John Hancock Arnett, a physician, and Katherine Williams McCollin, a singer and composer, Arnett was a Quaker and conscientious objector who served in the Civilian Public Service during World War II. Arnett completed his undergraduate degree at the University of Pennsylvania, and in 1949, earned a Ph.D from the same institution.

Academic career
He began teaching at the University of Pittsburgh in 1957. In 1968, Arnett was awarded a Guggenheim Fellowship.  He joined the faculty of Duke University in 1980 and, three years later, was named a member of the National Academy of Sciences. At Duke, Arnett was appointed the R.J. Reynolds Professor of Chemistry, and retired in 1992.

Personal life
Arnett died on May 11, 2022, at the age of 99.

Selected bibliography

References

1922 births
2022 deaths
20th-century American chemists
American conscientious objectors
Duke University faculty
Members of the Civilian Public Service
Members of the United States National Academy of Sciences
Scientists from Philadelphia
University of Pennsylvania alumni
University of Pittsburgh faculty